Robert's hocicudo (Oxymycterus roberti) is a rodent species from South America. It is found in Brazil and Paraguay.

References

Oxymycterus
Mammals described in 1901
Taxa named by Oldfield Thomas